The Thadou–Paite ethnic clash of 1997–1998 was a deadly conflict between the two communities in Churachandpur district in Manipur, India,  

The causes of the conflict were ethnic tensions and armed terrorism .  It started in June 1997 when insurgents executed nine Paite villagers.  Over 352 people died, thousands of homes were destroyed and over 13,000 people were displaced.  The Government of India sent in the Indian Army to attempt to stop the violence.  The conflict ended in September 1998 with a peace agreement between the two communities.

Cause of conflict 
The Thadou-speaking Kuki had been displaced from their home in the northern part of Manipur to Churachandpur. The Paite-Zomi were the original inhabitants of the district.

Part of the conflict came from the use of names.  Both communities were considered Kuki by Thadous.  However, the Paites preferred to call themselves "Zomi"- they considered the term "Kuki" to be a foreign slang word.  The Thadou-speaking Kukis considered this use of the word "Zomi" to be offensive to them. (See Mizo people#Etymology.)  The Thadou-speaking Kukis also believed that the Zomi/Paites were supporting Naga tribesmen, their enemies without any evidence.

By 1997, a group of minor tribes (including the Zou, Vaiphei, Gangte, Simte and Zomi) led by the Zomi/Paites formed the Zomi Reunification Organization (ZRO).  This group had a militant wing named the "Zomi Revolutionary Army" (ZRA).   At that time, the Thadou-speaking Kukis had already formed the militant Kuki National Front (KNF) and had been terrorising the villagers.

The KNF started imposing taxation on the Zomi/Paites, further escalating tensions .

Start of hostilities 
On 24 June 1997 KNF extremists lined up 20 villagers in Saikul and shot them, killing nine and wounding four.

These killings started a series of communal violence that also drew in smaller ethnic groups.  Several hundred Indian soldiers were moved into Churachandpur to restore order.  A peace agreement was negotiated after a few days by dignitaries from Mizoram Peace Mission, namely, Pu C. Chawngkunga, Pu H. Zathuam and Pu F. Lawmkima.  It was signed by the KNF(P) and the ZRO, at Mata Dam in Churachandpur on 8 July 1997. 

Two days later, KNF(P) militants invaded Mata village, breaking the agreement.

The warring parties were brought together again on 18 July 1997 to reaffirm the agreement.  However, the KNF (P) then attacked Leijangphai, Tallian and Savaipaih, burning thirteen houses.

Final peace 
On 29 September 1998, to make amends for the Saikul massacre and to end the conflict, the Kuki Inpi invited the Zomi Council to a feast.  A bull was slaughtered for the occasion and both groups shared the meal.

The next day, the Zomi Council reciprocated by inviting the Kukis to a feast. Hence, the conflict ended.

Conflict toll 
Over 50 villages were destroyed and some 13 000 people were displaced." According to official records kept by the Government of Manipur, the communal violence killed 352 persons, injured 136 and destroyed 4,670 houses. The majority moved to areas surrounding the district capital of Churachandpur and Mizoram, where they were housed in makeshift refugee centres in schools, hospitals and various other buildings. .

Peace agreement 
1. That, the nomenclatures Kuki and Zomi shall be mutually respected by all Zomis and Kukis. Every individual or group of persons shall be at liberty to call himself or themselves by any name, and the nomenclature KUKI and ZOMI shall not in any way be 
imposed upon any person or group against his/their will at any point of time.

2. That, any person who has occupied or has physical possession of any land/private building/houses and quarters wrongfully and illegally during the period of clashes shall return and restore to the rightful owners, such lands and buildings.

3. That, no Kuki or Zomi militant shall indulge themselves in any forcible collection of funds, taxes etc., against their counterpart nomenclature be it from the Government Officials, individuals, contractors, and business establishments.

4. That, all points of MoUs between the Kuki Inpi and the Zomi Council shall be operative and binding to all concerned persons and parties including the government.

Signed this 1 October 1998 on behalf of Kukis and Zomis respectively.

Sd/-
(Albert Gen Goukhup Mate)
President, Kuki Inpi 
Churachandpur

Sd/-
(K. Vungzalian)
Chairman, Zomi Council

References

Sources
Manipur Governor's Address to the Assembly on 9-03-1999
ZRO/ZRA

External links
 Blood brothers: Manipur once again on the brink as smaller tribes are drawn into the Kuki-Naga conflict

Ethnic conflicts
Violence in India
History of Manipur
1997 in India
1998 in India